The Safferstone House is a historic house at 2205 Arch Street in Little Rock, Arkansas.  It is a two-story stuccoed building, with a gabled terra cotta roof. A single-story gabled porch extends to the front across the left half, with a rounded archway in the front.  A recessed ell extends to the right of the main block, and a shed-roof bay projects to the left.  The house was built in 1925 and designed by Sanders and Ginocchio (Cromwell), and is an example of Spanish Mission Revival architecture.

The house was listed on the National Register of Historic Places in 1982.

See also
National Register of Historic Places listings in Little Rock, Arkansas

References

Houses on the National Register of Historic Places in Arkansas
Mission Revival architecture in Arkansas
Houses completed in 1920
Houses in Little Rock, Arkansas
National Register of Historic Places in Little Rock, Arkansas
Historic district contributing properties in Arkansas